Muravlevo is a rural locality in Shchetinsky Selsoviet Rural Settlement, Kursky District, Kursk Oblast, Russia. Population:

Geography 
The village is located on the Vinogrobl River (a left tributary of the Tuskar in the basin of the Seym), 102 km from the Russia–Ukraine border, 3 km north-east of the district center – the town Kursk, 4 km from the selsoviet center – Shchetinka.

 Streets
There is Pokrovskaya and 123 houses.

 Climate
Muravlevo has a warm-summer humid continental climate (Dfb in the Köppen climate classification).

Transport 
Muravlevo is located 7 km from the federal route  (Kursk – Voronezh –  "Kaspy" Highway; a part of the European route ), 2 km from the road of regional importance  (Kursk – Kastornoye), on the road of intermunicipal significance  (38K-016 – Muravlevo – Mikhaylovo – Nozdrachevo), 2 km from the nearest railway station Nozdrachyovo (railway line Kursk – 146 km).

The rural locality is situated 5 km from Kursk Vostochny Airport, 129 km from Belgorod International Airport and 202 km from Voronezh Peter the Great Airport.

References

Notes

Sources

Rural localities in Kursky District, Kursk Oblast